Nicolás Franco may refer to:

 Nicolás Franco (footballer) (born 1996), Argentine footballer
 Nicolás Franco (politician) (1891–1977), Spanish politician
 Nicolás Franco (naturalist) (born 1937), Spanish hunter and naturalist